The 1972 Giro d'Italia was the 55th edition of the Giro d'Italia, one of cycling's Grand Tours. The Giro began in Venice on 21 May, and Stage 12a occurred on 2 June with a stage from Forte dei Marmi. The race finished in Milan on 11 June.

Stage 12a
2 June 1972 — Forte dei Marmi,  (ITT)

Stage 12b
2 June 1972 — Forte dei Marmi,  (ITT)

Stage 13
3 June 1972 — Forte dei Marmi to Savona,

Stage 14

Rest day
5 June 1972

Stage 15
6 June 1972 — Parabiago to Parabiago,

Stage 16
7 June 1972 — Parabiago to Livigno,

Stage 17
8 June 1972 — Livigno to Passo dello Stelvio,

Stage 18
9 June 1972 — Sulden to Asiago,

Stage 19a
10 June 1972 — Asiago to Arco,

Stage 19b
10 June 1972 — Arco to Arco,  (ITT)

Stage 20
11 June 1972 — Arco to Milan,

References

1972 Giro d'Italia
Giro d'Italia stages